John Morison (September 9, 1818 – December 5, 1873) was an Ontario businessman and political figure. He represented Victoria North in the 1st Canadian Parliament as a Liberal member.

He was born in Greenock, Scotland in the year 1818, as the son of Malcolm Morison, and was educated there. He settled in Woodville in 1849, where he entered business as a merchant. Morison married Agnes Smith. He served as reeve for Eldon Township and was postmaster of Woodville for sixteen years. Morison died in Eldon Township at the age of 55.

References 

1818 births
1873 deaths
Liberal Party of Canada MPs
Members of the House of Commons of Canada from Ontario
Scottish emigrants to pre-Confederation Ontario
People from Greenock
Immigrants to the Province of Canada